The 2012–13 Latvian Hockey League season was the 22nd season of the Latvian Hockey League, the top level of ice hockey in Latvia. Eight teams participated in the league, and HK SMScredit won the championship.

Regular season

Playoffs

External links
 Latvian Ice Hockey Federation

Latvian Hockey League
Latvian Hockey League seasons
Latvian